Jordan Szwarz (born May 14, 1991) is a Canadian professional ice hockey player. He is currently playing with Adler Mannheim in the Deutsche Eishockey Liga (DEL). Szwarz was selected by the Phoenix Coyotes in the fourth round (97th overall) of the 2009 NHL Entry Draft. He later joined the Boston Bruins organization, before joining the Ottawa Senators as a free agent in July 2019.

Playing career
Szwarz played for the Saginaw Spirit of the Ontario Hockey League from 2007 to 2011 and became the team's third all-time leading scorer with 204 career OHL points. In the 2010–11 season with the Spirit, Szwarz was recognised as the team's Most Valuable Player and was awarded the Heart and Soul Award.

Szwarz made his professional debut with the San Antonio Rampage in the 2009–10 season.

On October 29, 2013, Szwarz made his NHL debut playing eight minutes and 16 seconds for the Phoenix Coyotes in a 3–1 win over the Los Angeles Kings.  His first NHL goal was scored in his next NHL game, on October 31 against Carter Hutton of the Nashville Predators.

After a career-best year in the AHL with the Providence Bruins in scoring 54 points in 65 games in the 2016–17 season, Szwarz signed as a free agent with Providence's NHL affiliate the Boston Bruins on a one-year, two-way deal on July 1, 2017.

During the 2017–18 season, having played his first games in the NHL with the Boston Bruins since 2015, Szwarz was signed to a one-year, two-way contract extension on March 31, 2018.

After three seasons within the Bruins organization, Szwarz left as a free agent to sign a one-year, two-way contract with the Ottawa Senators on July 1, 2019. Acquired to add depth to the Senators organization, Szwarz was assigned and selected as team captain with AHL affiliate the Binghamton Senators for the 2019–20 season. With the Division leading Binghamton, Szwarz collected 18 goals and 36 points through 48 regular season games before the season was cancelled due to the COVID-19 pandemic. He was scoreless in three games with the Ottawa Senators on a recall basis.

As an impending free agent, Szwarz opted to embark on a career abroad by agreeing to a one-year contract with Russian club, Torpedo Nizhny Novgorod of the Kontinental Hockey League, on July 22, 2020.

Following a lone season in the KHL, Szwarz left Russia and signed a two-year contract with German club, Adler Mannheim of the DEL, on May 17, 2021.

Career statistics

References

External links

1991 births
Adler Mannheim players
Arizona Coyotes draft picks
Arizona Coyotes players
Belleville Senators players
Boston Bruins players
Canadian ice hockey centres
Ice hockey people from Ontario
Living people
Ottawa Senators players
Phoenix Coyotes players
Portland Pirates players
Providence Bruins players
Saginaw Spirit players
San Antonio Rampage players
Sportspeople from Burlington, Ontario
Springfield Falcons players
Torpedo Nizhny Novgorod players